John H. McAvoy  (November 6, 1930 – May 22, 2008) was an American football and basketball coach and college athletic administrator.  He served as the head football coach at Hillsdale College in Hillsdale, Michigan.  He held that position for four seasons, from 1974 to 1977, compiling a record of 24–16–1.  McAvoy  was also the head basketball coach at Hillsdale for one season, in 1967–68, tallying a mark of 19–8.

McAvoy died at the age of 77, May 22, 2008, at his home in Dowagiac, Michigan.

Head coaching record

College football

References

1930 births
2008 deaths
American men's basketball players
Basketball coaches from Michigan
Hillsdale Chargers athletic directors
Hillsdale Chargers football coaches
Hillsdale Chargers football players
Hillsdale Chargers men's basketball coaches
Hillsdale Chargers men's basketball players
College men's track and field athletes in the United States
High school football coaches in Michigan
People from Dowagiac, Michigan
Players of American football from Michigan
Basketball players from Michigan